In Tahiti and Society Islands mythology, Taonoui is the mother by Roua of Fati and all the stars.

References

Tahiti and Society Islands goddesses
Stellar goddesses
Mother goddesses